Flower of the Dusk is a surviving 1918 silent film directed by John H. Collins and starring his wife Viola Dana. It was produced by Maxwell Karger and distributed by Metro Pictures. The film is based on the 1908 novel by Myrtle Reed.

A print is held by Bois d'Arcy in France.

Cast
Viola Dana - Barbara North
Howard Hall - Ambrose North
Jack McGowan - Roger Austin
Margaret McWade - Miriam
Bliss Milford - Mattie Austin

unbilled
Guy Coombs - 
Lettie Ford -
Maggie Greyer -
Alice Martin -
Charles Sutton -

References

External links

1918 films
American silent feature films
American black-and-white films
Silent American drama films
1918 drama films
Films directed by John H. Collins
Metro Pictures films
1910s American films